The West China Medical Center, Sichuan University, formerly the West China University of Medical Sciences, is a prestigious world-class public research institution of medical sciences located in Chengdu, Sichuan, China. 

The institution was founded as the private West China Union University by Western missionaries in 1914, being the earliest modern comprehensive university with medical sciences education in China. It once conducted dual-degree MD, DMD, BA, and BS programs with the State University of New York since 1920s and 1930s. In 1938, the university was accredited by the United States' National Board of Medical Examiners. As of 1949, the university held four colleges specializing in arts, science, medical sciences, and dentistry, with 26 academic departments, 2 professional studies departments, and 7 affiliated teaching hospitals.  

In 1951, after the Chinese Civil War, the Sichuan Provincial People's Government took over the university, renaming it as the public West China University. Under a higher education institution reformation plan directed by the Central People's Government of China, the university was deprived of other academic departments and turned into Sichuan Medical College with sole focus on medical studies in 1953. The college was upgraded as West China University of Medical Sciences in 1985. Under another reformation ordered by the State Council, the university was incorporated into Sichuan University in 2000 and named the West China Medical Center, Sichuan University.

The institution nowadays holds five schools and four affiliated teaching hospitals. Five schools include School of Basic and Forensic Medicine, School of Clinical Medicine (School of Nursing), School of Dentistry, School of Public Health, and School of Pharmacy. Four affiliated teaching hospitals respectively concentrate on comprehensive medical sciences, women and children's health, dentistry, and occupational disease treatment. Every school and teaching hospital is prefixed with the name "West China."

The institution is now sponsored by the Ministry of Education of China. The West China Hospital, Sichuan University (the institution's principal affiliated teaching hospital) is consistently ranked in the top 3 hospitals in China and the largest comprehensive hospital in the world.

History 

The West China Union College was co-founded by American Baptist Foreign Mission Society, American Methodist Episcopal Mission, Friends' Foreign Mission Association and Canadian Methodist Mission in 1910. Dr. O. L. Kilborn, Dr. R.G. Kilborn, and Dr. William Reginald Morse played key roles in its formation. The university's medical school was founded in 1914 and taught basic medicine and clinical medicine, biomedicine and stomatology. Three years later the school became the first to teach dentistry in China. In 1924 women were admitted to the college as a whole. Helen Yoh was the first woman to graduate medical school.

On September 23, 1933 West China Union University was registered with the Provincial Board of Education. In 1941 the East-West Cultural Agency, a foreign exchange student program for distinguished scholars and staff members, was created with the University of Cambridge and Oxford University.

In 1951 the school was renamed to West China University and then to Sichuan Medical College in 1953. In 1985 the school changed its name to West China University of Medical Sciences. It merged with Sichuan University in 2000 and became the West China Medical Center of Sichuan University.

Overview 
West China Medical Center of Sichuan University is situated in Chengdu, in the downtown area on the banks of Jin River. As one of the top five medical schools in China, the Center consists of five colleges:

West China College of Basic and Forensic Medicine of Sichuan University
West China School of Medicine of Sichuan University
West China College of Stomatology of Sichuan University
West China School of Public Health of Sichuan University
West China School of Pharmacy of Sichuan University

The Center offers bachelor, masters and doctorate degrees. Of more than 3,000 students, about one half of the students are in the bachelor's program and the rest are in the advanced programs.

According to China's University and College Admission System, in 2012 the Center was an A level rated school and the only Cochrane Center or "evidence based medical center" in Asia. It is one of only 15 of such centers in the world. The Implementation of the project has won a national prize from the Ministry of Education.

Partnerships 
West China Medical Center of Sichuan University is a member of the Institute for International Medical Education (IIME), INCLEN (International Clinical Epidemiology Network) and International Network of universities.

West China Medical Center of Sichuan University has cooperative agreements with 150 universities from 43 countries and regions such as the US, the UK, Canada, the Netherlands, Japan, Germany, Finland, Taiwan, Hong Kong and Australia. This includes University of Washington, UCLA, University of Michigan and 10 other universities from the US, Glasgow University and 2 others from the UK, and Waseda University, Hiroshima University and University of Yamanashi from Japan.

Recognition 
West China Medical Center of Sichuan University is listed in the World Directory of Medical schools published by WHO, The International Medical Education Directory (IMED), Educational Commission for Foreign Medical Graduates (ECFMG) and the Foundation of International Medical Education and Research (FAIMER).

Affiliated hospitals 

West China Medical Center of Sichuan University has four affiliated hospitals.

West China Hospital of Sichuan University is the largest hospital in China and the largest single-site hospital in the world and is consistently ranked in the top three hospitals in China. West China Hospital has 36 clinical departments, 15 medical technology departments and 25 open laboratories. In 2011, more than 3.5 million patients visited the outpatient department, 173,000 patients were discharged from inpatient departments, and more than 93,900 operations were performed. There are 4,300 beds. The hospital employs 6100 permanent staff of which 550 are professors or associate professors. The hospital offers 31 programs leading to doctorate degrees, doctorate programs in clinical medicine and post-doctoral programs in clinical and basic medicines. The hospital has 1 state laboratory, 2 key laboratories of the Ministry of Education, 9 key disciplines of Ministry of Education, 2 disciplines with the national "211 Project", 5 key programs of Ministry of Health, 16 key disciplines and 25 provincial level key laboratories.
West China Women's and Children's Hospital of Sichuan University, or West China Second Hospital of Sichuan University, has 600 beds. It was founded in 1988 on the basis of Department of Gynecology and Obstetrics and the Department of Pediatrics in the West China Hospital. West China Women's and Children's Hospital is under the immediate supervision of Ministry of Health of China. The title "Baby Friendly Hospital" was awarded by the Ministry of Health and WHO. The hospital contains China Birth Defect Monitoring Center, the Prenatal Research Center and the Emergency Center for Acute Respiratory Tract Infection in Children. It was Awarded the "Top Tertiary Hospital" in 1998. West China Women's and Children's Hospital's ob/gyns and pediatrics is rated as National Key Disciplines. The staff consists of 406 members of whom 61 are professors, 78 are associate professors. In 2011 the hospital served 3.5 million outpatients and emergency patients and performed 22,500 surgeries and 7600 deliveries.
West China Hospital of Stomatology of Sichuan University was founded in 1985. It is considered the cradle of modern stomatology in China. The hospital annually serves 400,000 patients in outpatients clinics and 3000 patients in inpatients wards. The hospital has a capacity of 220 dental chairs and its staff consists of 507 staff members.
 No.4 West China Teaching Hospital was founded in 1917. It is the only specialized hospital for occupational diseases among all the medical universities in China.

Notable alumni 
 Xia Liangcai, a noted oral medicine educator and one of the founders.

See also 
 Protestantism in Sichuan
 Anglicanism in Sichuan
 Methodism in Sichuan
 Wuhan University 
 Tongji Medical College, Huazhong University of Science and Technology

Notes

References

External links 

West China School of Medicine / West China Hospital 

Medical schools in China
Education in Chengdu
Sichuan University
Protestantism in Sichuan
Christianity in Chengdu